Sergey Kulibaba (born 24 July 1959) is a former Soviet pole vaulter. He competed in the men's pole vault at the 1980 Summer Olympics.

References

1959 births
Living people
Athletes (track and field) at the 1980 Summer Olympics
Soviet male pole vaulters
Olympic athletes of the Soviet Union
Place of birth missing (living people)